A. I. duPont may refer to:

Alfred I. duPont (1864 – 1935), American industrialist, financier and philanthropist
Alexis I. duPont High School, public high school located in Greenville, Delaware, USA, a suburb of Wilmington
Alfred I. duPont Hospital for Children